This is an index of lists of Tamil-language media.

 List of Tamil-language newspapers 
 List of Tamil-language radio stations
 List of Tamil-language television channels
 List of Tamil-language magazines
 List of Tamil-language films

See also
Media in Chennai